The discography of English singer-songwriter Patrick Wolf contains six studio albums, twelve singles and four extended plays.

Studio albums

Extended plays

Singles

Music videos

Other appearances
 Covered Kate Bush's Army Dreamers for Buffetlibre's Amnesty project
 "Army of Me" (Army of Klaus remix) on Army of Me: Remixes and Covers, album of remixes and covers of the song "Army of Me" by Björk
 Collaborated with Bishi for her album Nights at the Circus
 The track "Careless Talk" from the soundtrack to the film The Edge of Love
 Guest vocals on "On Sussex Downs" by Larrikin Love
 "This Joke Sport Severed" (Patrick Wolf's Love Letter to Richey Remix) on Journal for Plague Lovers Remix album by Manic Street Preachers
 Covered The Beach Boys' "I Just Wasn't Made for These Times".

References

Wolf, Patrick